Polk Robison (May 24, 1912 – June 27, 2008) was an American collegiate basketball and football coach and college athletics administrator who served as the head coach of the Texas Tech Red Raiders basketball team from 1942 to 1946 and again from 1947 to 1961. He served as the university's athletic director from 1961 to 1969.

Student
As a student at Texas Tech, Robison tried out for the football team but did not make the cut. However, he did letter in basketball and tennis. After graduating in 1934, he helped coach football and tennis in the 1940s.

Head basketball coach
Robison coached the Red Raiders basketball teams to their first NCAA tournament appearances—in 1954, 1956, and 1961. His overall record at the school was 254–195.

Athletic director
After stepping down from his coaching position in 1961, Robison served as the athletic director at Texas Tech until 1969. He served two more years on the athletics staff before finally retiring in 1971.

To honor Robison's years of service, the Polk Robison Men's Basketball Hall of Honor was created in 2003. It is located on the north side of the main lobby of United Supermarkets Arena.

Death
Robison died of natural causes on Friday, June 27, 2008 at the age of 96.

Head coaching record

References

1912 births
2008 deaths
American men's basketball coaches
American men's basketball players
Basketball coaches from Tennessee
Basketball players from Tennessee
Texas Tech Red Raiders athletic directors
Texas Tech Red Raiders basketball coaches
Texas Tech Red Raiders basketball players
Texas Tech Red Raiders football coaches
Place of birth missing